Maniaxe is Ghoul's 2003 follow up to their debut album We Came for the Dead!!!, released by Razorback Records. As before, the lyrics in this album continue the band's storyline, and introduces Ghoul's new nemesis, "The Ghoul Hunter." Maniaxe also introduces a fourth member to Ghoul, "Dissector".

The last track "What a Wonderful World" is a parody of Louis Armstrong's hit, with the lyrics perverted into an observation of nuclear war.

Track listing

Personnel
Cremator - Vocals, Bass
Dissector - Vocals, Guitars
Digestor - Vocals, Guitars
Fermentor - Drums

References

2003 albums
Concept albums
Ghoul (band) albums